The Detroit and Mackinac Railway , informally known as the "Turtle Line", was a railroad in the northeastern part of the Lower Peninsula of the U.S. state of Michigan.  The railroad had its main offices and shops in Tawas City with its main line running from Bay City north to Cheboygan, and operated from 1894 to 1992.

At the end of 1925 it incorporated 375 miles of road and 470 miles of track; that year the Turtle Line reported 81 million ton-miles of revenue freight and seven million passenger-miles. In 1967 it reported 124 million ton-miles on 224 miles of road.

History
The Detroit, Bay City & Alpena Railroad, was a  narrow gauge short line operated from Bay City northward to the Lake Huron port of Alpena. During the late 1890s and the first decade of the Twentieth Century, the timber resources of northeastern Michigan were fully utilized and the D&M expanded its trackage northward from Alpena to Cheboygan. The Bay City-Cheboygan main line prospered, and a stone passenger depot was constructed in Harrisville.

The main constituent of the freight service offered by the D&M and its predecessor railroads was timber from what was then the vast forests of northeastern Michigan; the D&M built spurs and branch lines to the forested areas. Another branch line served the limestone quarries of Rogers City. In 1922, the railroad also had branch lines to Au Gres, Comins, Curran, Hillman, Lincoln, Prescott, and Rose City.

In the 1940s, D&M had enough revenue to be a Class I railroad and it was one of the first such to eliminate steam locomotives in 1948.

In March 1976, the Detroit & Mackinac acquired a combination of trackage and operating trackage rights from the remains of the bankrupt Penn Central that created an alternate main line from Bay City northward, through Gaylord and Cheboygan, to Mackinaw City.  However, adverse economic conditions continued to affect railroad operations in the northeastern United States. The road was sold to the Lake State Railway in 1992, and ended its existence as an independent railroad.

The Detroit & Mackinac called itself the "Turtle Line" and its logo symbol was "Mackinac Mac".  The railroad bore the hostile backronym of "Defeated & Maltreated".

Passenger service
The D&M mainline from Bay City to Alpena offered sleeping car and meal services between Detroit and Alpena in the 1930s. Continuing coaches were carried over Michigan Central Railroad tracks from Detroit to Bay City. Separate motor coach trains operating daily except Sunday carried passengers from Alpena to the northern extent of D&M territory, Cheboygan.

By the 1940s, meal services had disappeared. By 1949, service was reduced to a morning trip from Bay City to Alpena and a reverse trip in the evening. Sleeping cars were eliminated. And service from Alpena to Cheboygan was discontinued as well. Passenger service had been eliminated by 1951.

Named train passenger service in the mid-1930s consisted of:
Resorter (#1), sleeping car, Detroit to Alpena; coach, Bay City to Alpena (coach passengers would take a Michigan Central train from Detroit to Bay City)
Clipper (#3), coach via Michigan Central, Detroit to Bay City; motor coach train from Bay City to Alpena
New Yorker (#4), motor coach train from Alpena to Bay City; coach via Michigan Central, Bay City to Detroit
Sunset (#12), sleeping car, Alpena to Detroit; coach, Alpena to Bay City (coach passengers would take a Michigan Central train from Bay City to Detroit)

Legacy
The Lake State Railway continued as of 2012 to use traditional handheld technology (picks, shovels, hammers) to replace railroad ties and make other roadbed repairs on surviving trackage that had previously been part of the Detroit and Mackinac system.

A collection of D&M artifacts, including a 1920s switching engine, are housed at the depot in Lincoln, Michigan. The stone depot in Standish, Michigan is also a museum, with rolling stock. The railroad's GE 44-ton locomotive, #10, has been preserved by the Southern Michigan Railroad Society. 0-6-0 Locomotive #8 (Baldwin Locomotive Works #41228) is preserved and awaiting restoration in storage at The Henry Ford (Greenfield Village) in Dearborn, Michigan.

See also
 Harrisville, Michigan – stone depot
 Lincoln, Michigan – wooden depot museum, with rolling stock–switch engine and caboose
 Standish, Michigan – stone depot museum, with rolling stock
Southern Michigan Railroad Society
 Aloha State Park: A park created by the railroad.

References

Further reading
Wakeman, George L., My Story of the Detroit & Mackinac Railroad  Library of Michigan, Lansing, 1940.

External links
Detroit and Mackinac Railway Historical Society home page

Detroit and Mackinac Railway System Map.
Detroit and Mackinac Railway Time Table
Detroit and Mackinac Railway, Photographic roster

Defunct companies based in Michigan
Defunct Michigan railroads
Former Class I railroads in the United States
Northern Michigan
Railway companies established in 1894
Railway companies disestablished in 1992
1894 establishments in Michigan